This list of the Cenozoic life of Idaho contains the various prehistoric life-forms whose fossilized remains have been reported from within the US state of Idaho and are between 66 million and 10,000 years of age.

A

  Abies
 †Abies alvordensis
 †Abies concoloroides
 †Abies conncoloroides
 †Abies idahoensis – type locality for species
 †Abies klamathensis
 †Abies sonomensis
 †Abies toxirivus
 Acer
 †Acer bendirei
 †Acer bolanderi
 †Acer columbianum
 †Acer florissanti
 †Acer glabroides
 †Acer hueberi
 †Acer idahoensis
 †Acer macginitiei
 †Acer minor
 †Acer oregonianum
 †Acer salmonensis
 †Acer scottiae
 †Acer tiffneyi
  †Acritohippus
 †Acritohippus isonesus
  †Aepycamelus
 †Aesculus
 †Aesculus montanus
 Agelaius
 †Agelaius phoeniceus
  †Agriotherium
 †Agriotherium schneideri – or unidentified comparable form
 †Alforjas – tentative report
 †Alilepus
 †Alilepus vagus – type locality for species
 Alnus
 †Alnus carpinoides
 †Alnus fairii
 †Alnus fossilis
 †Alnus hollandiana
 †Alnus latahensis
 †Alnus lemhiensis – type locality for species
 †Alnus relatus
 †Alnus rossi
 †Alphagaulus
 †Alphagaulus pristinus
  †Amebelodon
 †Amebelodon floridanus – or unidentified comparable form
 Amelanchier
 †Amelanchier couleeana
 †Amelanchier dignatus
 Anas
 †Anas platyrhynchos
 Anser
 †Anser caerulescens
  Antilocapra
 †Antilocapra americana
 Antrozous
 †Antrozous pallidus
  †Aphelops
 †Aphelops malacorhinus – or unidentified comparable form
 †Archaeohippus
 †Archaeohippus ultimus
  †Arctodus
 †Arctodus simus
 Ardea
 †Ardea herodias

B

 Baiomys
 †Baiomys aquilonius – type locality for species
 Betula
 †Betula ashleyi
 †Betula lemhiensis – type locality for species
 †Betula thor
 †Betula vera
 Bibio
 †Bibio latahensis – type locality for species
 †Bibio testeus – type locality for species
 Bison
 †Bison alaskensis
 †Bison antiquus – or unidentified comparable form
  †Bison latifrons
 †Bison priscus
 Boletina
 †Bolitophila
 †Bolitophila pulveris – type locality for species
 †Bombus
 †Bombus proavus – tentative report
 Bonasa
 †Bonasa umbellus
 †Bootherium
  †Bootherium bombifrons
  †Borophagus
 †Borophagus diversidens
 †Borophagus hilli
 †Borophagus pugnator
  †Brachycrus
 Brachylagus
 †Brachylagus idahoensis
 Branta
 †Branta canadensis
 Bucephala
 †Buisnictis
 †Buisnictis breviramus

C

  †Camelops
 †Camelops hesternus
 Camponotus
 Canis
  †Canis dirus
 †Canis ferox
 †Canis latrans
 †Canis lepophagus
 Carya
 †Carya benderei
 †Carya bendrerei
 †Carya libbeyi
 Castor
 †Castor californicus
 †Castor canadensis
 Ceanothus
 †Ceanothus chaneyi
 Cedrela
 †Cedrela pteraformis
 †Ceratomeryx – type locality for genus
 †Ceratomeryx prenticei – type locality for species
 Cercidiphyllum
 †Cercidiphyllum crenatum
 †Cercidiphyllum elongatum
 Cervus
 †Cervus elaphus – or unidentified comparable form
 †Chamaecyparis
 †Chamaecyparis edwardsii – type locality for species
 †Chamaecyparis linguaefolia
 Chen
 †Chen pressa – type locality for species
 †Chrysolepis
 †Chrysolepis haynesii – type locality for species
 Ciconia – tentative report
  †Ciconia maltha
 Colymbus
 Comptonia
 †Comptonia hesperia
 †Conites – tentative report
 †Copemys – tentative report
 Cornus
 †Cornus ovalis
 †Cosomys
 †Cosomys primus
  †Cosoryx
  Craigia
 †Craigia oregonensis
 Crataegus
 †Crataegus bakeri – type locality for species
 †Crataegus flavescens
 †Crataegus haynesii – type locality for species
 †Cunninghamia
 †Cunninghamia marquettii – type locality for species
 Cygnus
 †Cygnus hibbardi – type locality for species
 Cynomys
 †Cynomys niobrarius
 †Cynorca

D

 †Dennstaedtia
 †Dennstaedtia americana
  †Diceratherium
 †Diceratherium niobrarense
 †Diplodipelta
 †Diplodipelta reniptera
 †Dipoides
 †Dipoides stirtoni
 Dolichoderus
 †Domnina
  †Dromomeryx
 Dytiscus
 †Dytiscus miocenicus – type locality for species

E

 Elaphe
 †Elaphe pliocenica – type locality for species
 †Elaphe vulpina
 †Entoptychus
 †Entoptychus fieldsi
 †Entoptychus sheppardi
 †Eotermes
  †Epicyon
 †Epicyon haydeni
 †Equisetum
 †Equisetum alexanderi
 †Equisetum arcticum – or unidentified comparable form
 †Equisetum octangulatum
 Equus
 †Equus fromanius
 †Equus idahoensis
  †Equus scotti
  †Equus simplicidens
 Erethizon
 †Erethizon bathygnathum
 †Erethizon dorsatum
 †Eucommia
 †Eucommia serrata
 †Euptelea
 †Euptelea dilcherii – type locality for species
 Exechia
 †Exechia juliaetta – type locality for species

F

 Falco
 †Falco peregrinus
 Felis
 †Felis lacustris
 †Felis rexroadensis
 †Ferinestrix
 †Ferinestrix vorax – type locality for species
  †Fraxinus
 †Fraxinus coulteri
 †Fraxinus stenocarpa – type locality for species

G

 Gallinula
 †Gallinula chloropus
 †Garrya
 †Garrya idahoensis
 †Gigantocamelus
 †Gigantocamelus spatulus
 Ginkgo
  †Ginkgo adiantoides
 †Gleditsia
 †Gleditsia lottii – type locality for species

H

 Halesia
 †Halesia columbiana
 †Hemiauchenia
 †Hemiauchenia macrocephala
 Homo
 †Homo sapiens
  †Homotherium
 †Homotherium idahoensis
 †Homotherium serum
 Hydrangea
 †Hydrangea bendirei
  †Hypohippus
 †Hypolagus
 †Hypolagus edensis
 †Hypolagus furlongi
 †Hypolagus gidleyi
 †Hypolagus vetus
 †Hypolagus voorhiesi

I

  Ilex
 †Ilex idahoensis

J

 Juglans
 †Juglans browniana

L

 Larix
 †Larix cassiana
 †Larix lemhiensis – type locality for species
  Lasiurus
 †Lasiurus fossilis
 Lasius
 †Ledum
 †Ledum idahoensis – type locality for species
 Lepus
 Libocedrus
 †Libocedrus masoni
 †Limnephilus
 †Liriodendron
 †Liriodendron hesperia
 †Lithocarpus
 †Lithocarpus weidei
 Lontra
 †Lontra canadensis
 †Lontra weiri – type locality for species
  Lynx
 †Lynx canadensis
 †Lynx rufus

M

 †Macrophya
 †Macrophya adventitia – type locality for species
 Mahonia
 †Mahonia creedensis
 †Mahonia reticulata
 †Mahonia simplex
 †Mammut
  †Mammut americanum
 †Mammuthus
  †Mammuthus columbi
 †Mammuthus hayi
 †Martinogale
 †Megacamelus
 †Megaleuctra
 †Megaleuctra jewetti – type locality for species
 †Megalonyx
 †Megalonyx jeffersonii
  †Megalonyx leptostomus
  †Megantereon
 †Megantereon hesperus
 Meleagris
 †Meleagris gallopavo
 Mergus
 †Mergus merganser
 †Merychyus
 †Merychyus elegans
 †Merychyus smithi
 †Mesoreodon
 †Mesoreodon chelonyx
 Messor – tentative report
 †Metalopex
 †Metalopex merriami
 Metasequoia
 †Metasequoia occidentalis
 †Michenia
 Mictomys
 †Mictomys vetus
 †Mimomys
  †Miohippus
 †Miohippus gemmarosae – or unidentified comparable form
 †Miolabis – tentative report
 †Miopsyche
 Mustela
 †Mustela rexroadensis

N

 Natrix
 †Natrix hibbardi – type locality for species
  Neophrontops
 †Neophrontops slaughteri – type locality for species
 Neotoma
 †Neotoma quadriplicata – or unidentified comparable form
 †Neotragocerus
 †Neotragocerus lindgreni – type locality for species
 †Niglarodon
 †Niglarodon petersonensis
 †Niglarodon yeariani
 †Nymphaeites
 †Nymphaeites nevadensis
 †Nyssa
 †Nyssa hesperia

O

  Odocoileus
 Ondatra
 †Ondatra idahoensis – type locality for species
 †Ondatra minor
 †Ondatra zibethicus
 †Ophiomys
 †Ophiomys parvus – type locality for species
 †Ophiomys taylori
 †Oregonomys
 †Oregonomys magnus
 †Oregonomys pebblespringsensis – or unidentified comparable form
 †Oreolagus
 †Osmunda
 †Osmunda occidentale
 †Osmunda occidentalis
 Ostrya
 †Ostrya oregoniana
  †Oxydactylus

P

 †Paciculus
 †Paciculus montanus
 †Paenemarmota
 †Paenemarmota barbouri
 †Paenemarmota sawrockensis
  †Palaeolagus – tentative report
 Panthera
  †Panthera leo
 †Paracryptotis
 †Paracryptotis gidleyi
 †Paramicrotoscoptes
 †Paramicrotoscoptes hibbardi
  †Paramylodon
 †Paramylodon harlani
 †Paratamias – type locality for genus
 †Paratamias tarassus – type locality for species
 †Parthenocissus
 †Parthenocissus idahoensis
 Pelecanus
 †Pelecanus halieus – type locality for species
 Perognathus
 †Perognathus maldei – type locality for species
 Peromyscus
 †Peromyscus hagermanensis – type locality for species
  Persea
 †Persea pseudocarolinensis
 Phalacrocorax
  †Phalacrocorax auritus
 †Phalacrocorax idahensis
 †Phalacrocorax macer – type locality for species
 Phenacomys
 †Phenacomys gryci
 Phryganea
 Picea
 †Picea coloradensis
 †Picea lahontense
 †Picea magna
 †Picea sonomensis
  Pinus
 †Pinus alvordensis
 †Pinus baileyii – type locality for species
 †Pinus harneyana
 †Pinus ponderosoides
 †Pinus prestrobus – type locality for species
 †Pinus wheeleri
 Platanus
 †Platanus idahoensis – type locality for species
  †Platygonus
 †Platygonus pearcei – type locality for species
 †Plesiosorex
 †Plesiosorex coloradensis – or unidentified comparable form
 †Pliogeomys
 †Pliogeomys parvus – type locality for species
 †Pliophenacomys
 †Pliophenacomys meadensis
 †Pliophenacomys osborni
 †Pliosaccomys
 †Pliotaxidea
 †Pliotaxidea nevadensis – or unidentified comparable form
 Populus
 †Populus cinnamonoides
 †Populus eotremuloides
 Porzana
 †Porzana lacustris – type locality for species
 †Potamogeton
 †Potamogeton knowltoni
 †Problastomeryx
 †Problastomeryx primus
 †Procastoroides
 †Procastoroides idahoensis
 †Procastoroides intermedius
 Procyon
 †Procyon lotor
 †Prodipodomys
 †Prodipodomys idahoensis – type locality for species
  †Promerycochoerus
 †Promerycochoerus superbus
 †Propentacora
 †Propentacora froeschneri – type locality for species
 †Protolabis
  Prunus
 †Prunus chaneyi
 †Prunus treasheri
 †Pseudofagus – type locality for genus
 †Pseudofagus idahoensis – type locality for species
  †Pseudolarix
 †Pseudolarix americana
 †Pseudolarix americcana
 †Pseudotsuga
 †Pseudotsuga glaucoides
 †Pseudotsuga longifolia
 Pterocarya
 †Pterocarya mixta
 Puma
 †Puma concolor

Q

  Quercus
 †Quercus bilobata – type locality for species
 †Quercus castormontis – type locality for species
 †Quercus hannibali
 †Quercus haynesii – type locality for species
 †Quercus mccanni
 †Quercus moyei – type locality for species
 †Quercus simulata
 †Quercus snookensis – type locality for species
 Querquedula

R

 Rangifer
  †Rangifer tarandus
 †Rhamnus
 †Rhamnus columbiana
 Rhododendron
 †Rhododendron chaneyi
 Rhus
 †Rhus alvordensis
  †Rhynchotherium
 †Ribes
 Rosa
 †Rosa germerensis
 †Rymosia
 †Rymosia miocenica – type locality for species

S

 Salix
 †Salix cassiana
 †Salix hesperia
 †Salix knowltoni
 †Salix lemhiensis – type locality for species
 Sassafras
 †Sassafras ashleyi
 †Sassafras columbiana
  †Satherium
 †Satherium piscinarium
 Scapanus
 †Scapanus hagermanensis – type locality for species
 †Scapanus proceridens – or unidentified comparable form
 †Scapanus townsendii – or unidentified related form
 Sciara
 †Sciara sepulta – type locality for species
 Sequoia
 †Sequoia affinis
 †Sequoiadendron
 †Sequoiadendron chaneyi
  †Simocyon
 †Simocyon primigenius – or unidentified comparable form
 †Smilax
 †Smilax trinervis – or unidentified comparable form
  †Smilodon
 †Smilodon fatalis
 †Sminthosinis
 †Sminthosinis bowleri – type locality for species
 †Sophora
 †Sophora spokanensis
 †Sorbus
 †Sorbus cassiana
 †Sorbus mcjannetii
 Sorex
 †Sorex hagermanensis – type locality for species
 †Sorex meltoni – type locality for species
  †Sorex palustris
 †Sorex powersi – type locality for species
 †Sorex rexroadensis – or unidentified comparable form
 Spermophilus
 †Spermophilus gidleyi
 Sphecophaga – tentative report
 †Spiraea
 †Spiraea idahoensis – type locality for species
  †Stegomastodon
 †Stegomastodon mirificus
  Sthenictis
 Sylvicola
 †Sylvicola carolae – type locality for species
 †Symphoricarpos
 †Symphoricarpos salmonense
 †Symphoricarpos salmonensis

T

 Taxidea
  †Taxidea taxus
 Taxodium
 †Taxodium dubium
  †Teleoceras
 Thamnophis
 Thomomys
 †Thomomys gidleyi
 †Thomomys townsendii
 †Thuja
 †Thuja dimorpha
  †Ticholeptus
 †Ticholeptus zygomaticus
 Tilia
 †Tilia circularis
 †Tilia hallii
 †Trigonictis
 †Trigonictis cookii
 †Trigonictis macrodon
 †Trilaccogaulus
 †Trilaccogaulus lemhiensis
 †Tsuga
 †Tsuga mertensioides
 Typha
 †Typha lesquereuxi

U

  Ulmus
 †Ulmus knowltoni
 †Ulmus moorei
 †Ulmus paucidentata
 †Ulmus speciosa
 †Ungnadia
 †Ungnadia clarki
 Ursus
 †Ursus abstrusus – type locality for species

V

  †Vaccinium
 †Vaccinium sonomensis
 †Vauquelinia
 Vulpes
 †Vulpes vulpes

Z

  Zelkova
 †Zelkova brownii
 †Zelkova oregoniana

References
 

Cenozoic
Cenozoic Idaho
Idaho